Bouafles is a commune in the Eure department in Normandy in northern France.

It located is 6 km south-west of Les Andelys on the river Seine.

Notable buildings include the Chateau De Bouafles in Rue De Mousseaux;  Église Saint-Pierre in Rue Du Préleran; and the Mairie de Bouafles in Rue Haute.

In the grounds of the Chateau de Bouafles is a static caravan site, Caravaning residentiel du Chateau de Bouafles.

Population

See also
Communes of the Eure department

References

Mairie de Bouafles

Communes of Eure